The following is a list of wars involving Albanian rebels in the post–Cold War era.

The list gives the name, the date, combatants, and the result of these conflicts following this legend:

List

See also 

 List of wars involving Albania

References 

Albanian militant groups
Kosovo Liberation Army